Zahm is a surname. Notable people with the surname include:

Albert Francis Zahm (1862–1954), aeronautical experimenter, professor, and aeronautical division chief of U.S. Library of Congress
Charlie Zahm, American singer and player of Celtic, maritime and traditional American music
John Augustine Zahm (1851–1921), Holy Cross priest, author, scientist, and South American explorer
Lewis Zahm, Union Civil War officer from Ohio who was commissioned a colonel on August 6, 1861, for organizing the 3rd Ohio Cavalry
Olivier Zahm (born 1964), French art critic, curator, fashion editor, art director and photographer

See also
Zahm Andrist, mountain in the Bernese Alps in Switzerland
Zahm Hall (University of Notre Dame), one of the 29 residence halls and one of the 15 male dorms on the campus of the University of Notre Dame
Elly Zahm, character in James Mitchner's novel Centennial, and the TV series based on the neovel